Hatya Kaand is a Hindi action thriller film of Bollywood directed by Girish Manukant and produced by Raojibhai J. Patel. This film was released on 4 September 1998 in the banner of R.A. Movies.

Plot
A talented student can not get any job due to corruption and nepotism. His four friends also could not secure a job in spite of bribing ministers rather, and they are tortured by a corrupt cop for raising their voice against this injustice. Being deprived, they decide to take revenge on them. At the end of the film, they kill the minister in open court.

Cast
 Prem Chopra as Minister
 Deepak Parashar as Student
 Rakesh Bedi as Student
 Anjana Mumtaz
 Deepak Shirke as Police officer
 Satyen Kappu
 Dinesh Hingoo
 Mahavir Shah as Advocate
 Subbiraj
 Javed Khan
 Ajit Vachhani
 Ravinder Mann
 Leira Mendonca

References

External links
 

1998 films
Indian action thriller films
1998 action thriller films
1990s Hindi-language films